"Prototype" is the 29th episode of science fiction television series Star Trek: Voyager, and the 13th episode in the second season. It was written by Nicholas Corea and directed by Jonathan Frakes. This episode was broadcast on UPN Network on January 15, 1996. In this episode, the crew of spaceship making their way back to Earth have an encounter with a race of warring robotic life forms.

Plot

The episode begins with a first person point of view, with an object in space, scanning the surroundings in black and white. It then sees Voyager and is beamed aboard. Chief Engineer B'Elanna Torres and Lt. Tuvok lean over it. The next thing the object sees is Engineering, and its reflection. It is a robot.

Aboard Voyager, the robot's battered body is examined by Lieutenant Tuvok, Captain Kathryn Janeway and Lieutenant B'Elanna Torres and found to have a quickly dying plasma-based energy source. Tuvok suggests they let the source fizzle out and examine the body in an incapacitated state, but Torres suggests they try to revive the robot to discover more about it. For the sake of scientific exploration, Janeway agrees.

After consulting with Ensign Harry Kim and the Doctor, Torres manages to revive the robot by modifying its energy source to accept plasma taken directly from Voyager's warp core. The robot's body activates, introduces itself as "Automated Unit 3947" and thanks Torres for her actions. While Torres is examining 3947, the robot reveals how he had come to be drifting in space, saying that he was in a mining pod that exploded. 3947 then asks Torres whether she could duplicate the energy source she made and use it to create a prototype Automated Unit, since the units themselves found they were unable to do so on their own. The robots were designed by what 3947 calls "the Builders," which have since become extinct.

Torres, though she is personally willing to carry out the experiment, takes the question to Captain Janeway, who reminds her that doing so would be a violation of the Prime Directive in that it would give the capability to reproduce to a race that was not designed to do so, thereby interfering with its culture, and forbids her to try. Torres objects, but fruitlessly. 3947 is disappointed, and claims that without Torres' assistance, their race will die out. Torres is empathetic, but can do nothing. A ship commanded by more Automated Units approaches Voyager in order to pick up 3947.

While saying goodbye to Torres, 3947 uses a bolt of electricity to knock her unconscious. He then proceeds to hijack the transporter controls and sends himself and Torres to a laboratory aboard the robots' ship. He informs Torres that she will work on the prototype unit here. Voyager attempts to beam Torres out, but the signals are blocked by the robots' shielding. Janeway proceeds to attack the robot ship, but is outgunned and nearly crippled. Torres is forced to promise to build the prototype in order to stop the robots destroying Voyager.

While Torres works on the prototype with 3947, answering his questions about other units in their society and informing him that Data is the only android among them and is treated like any human, Janeway tries to figure out how to rescue her. They finally realize that if a shuttle could get past the robots' shields, it could beam Torres away. While they are looking for a way to distract the robot ship, a second ship, piloted by similar-looking robots, appears and attacks the first robotic ship. Just as the first shots are fired between the robots, Torres finally succeeds in completing a functional prototype, named "0001". It sits up and repeatedly asks for further programming. Paris, piloting the shuttle, uses a breach in the robotic shields to sneak closer to the ship.

When asked by Torres why robots are at war with each other, 3947 further reveals the robot race's history: their Builders (two races, the Pralor and the Cravic) were at war with each other and designed these robots to be soldiers. When the Pralor and Cravic decided to call a ceasefire, they attempted to terminate their robot soldiers. The robots, now seeing their Builders as "the enemy" (whom they are programmed to kill no matter what), turned on their makers, wiped them out and resumed the war. A horrified Torres realizes she has upset the balance of the war by creating her prototype, and, with only a moment's hesitation, plunges an electrically charged knife into the prototype's body, causing it to short-circuit and be destroyed. 3947 uses a bolt of electricity which knocks Torres down.

"I told 6263 you were not our enemy," 3947 says to Torres from across the body of the prototype. She replies, "I never wanted to be your enemy. I'm sorry," just as Paris beams her out. The two robotic ships are so engaged in their battle that the Pralor cannot go after the departing Voyager.

Reception 
This had Nielsen ratings of 5.9 points when it was broadcast on television in 1996.

Cinefantastique rated this episode 2.5 out of four.
Tor.com rated it 7 out of 10.

In 2020, Gizmodo listed this episode as one of the "must watch" episodes from season two of the show.

References

External links

 

Star Trek: Voyager (season 2) episodes
1996 American television episodes
Television episodes directed by Jonathan Frakes
Television episodes about artificial intelligence